The United States Penitentiary, Thomson (USP Thomson), formerly Thomson Correctional Center, is a high-security federal prison located in Thomson, Illinois. Thomson has eight cellhouses with a rated capacity of 2,100 beds—1,900 high-security SMU beds and 200 minimum-security beds at the onsite camp—and according to BOP officials, the potential to use some of its high-security rated capacity to house up to 400 ADX inmates. From its completion in 2001 to 2006, it remained empty. By 2009, only the minimum-security section housed prisoners.

In October 2012, the Federal Bureau of Prisons (BOP) purchased Thomson Correctional Center from the State of Illinois for $165 million. Plans to transfer inmates from Guantanamo Bay to the facility had already been blocked by Congress.

In August 2014, Donald Hudson was named the first warden of the prison. The prison was fully activated in January 2019 and as of March 2020, the prison had an inmate population of 1,067. In June 2019, the prison crossed the 400 employee mark with an authorization to hire 200 more over the next few years as inmate population continues to ramp up.
As of May 2020, USP Thomson holds 1009 inmates at the high-security USP and 74 at the minimum security camp.

History
The building of the prison was controversial; early plans suggested using the site of the former Savanna Army Depot, several miles north of Thomson.  One of the main reasons the prison was controversial was concern that the prison would have a negative impact on the environment, especially being so close to the Mississippi River.

Thomson Correctional Center was built between May 1999 and November 2001.  Its completion cost $140 million, but the state omitted opening costs from the 2002 budget, and Governor George H. Ryan called for a delay to the opening to save $50 million per year in operating costs.  By 2009, the total cost to the state of Illinois had exceeded $170 million.  The minimum security unit has an annual budget of $7 million. State budget constraints as well as labor union opposition to closing other state prisons prevented the maximum-security prison from opening.

In 2008, Illinois Governor Rod Blagojevich proposed to close the state prison in Pontiac and to open the Thomson maximum-security unit instead. However, Blagojevich was subsequently arrested on December 9, 2008, and was removed from office.  His replacement, Governor Pat Quinn, cancelled plans to close the Pontiac prison in March 2009, leaving Thomson unused.

Transfer of Guantanamo Bay detainees 

On December 15, 2009, U.S. President Barack Obama, via a Presidential memorandum, formally ordered the departments of Justice and Defense to arrange federal ownership of the prison, and prepare for transfer there of both federal prisoners and Guantanamo detainees. According to previous press reports, the acquisition plan contemplated housing  up to 100 inmates from the camp, in addition to other federal prisoners.  The Federal Bureau of Prisons would erect a more secure perimeter fence, so its perimeter security exceeded supermax standards.  The portion of the Thomson prison that would be used to house Guantanamo detainees would be operated by the Department of Defense, while the rest of the prison would be operated by the Federal Bureau of Prisons.

CNN stated that before the decision was announced, many in the town had welcomed the idea of Guantanamo prisoners being housed in their town, in hopes it would revitalize the local economy and bring jobs. However, funding for detainee transfers was blocked.

Federal Bureau of Prisons Purchase 
Illinois Senator Dick Durbin’s office announced on October 2, 2012, that the Obama administration and Federal Bureau of Prisons would buy the Thomson Correctional Center from the state of Illinois for $165 million. An administration official said the deal was to address overcrowding issues, and Thomson would not be used to house any Guantanamo detainees, which the official noted was prohibited by law. "The entire facility will house only [Bureau of Prisons] inmates (up to 2,800) and be operated solely by BOP.  Specifically, it will be used for administrative maximum security inmates and others who have proven difficult to manage in high-security institutions," said the official, who asked not to be named. This statement was echoed in a letter from United States Attorney General Eric Holder. "I have committed that no Guantanamo detainees will be transferred to Thomson. As you know, any such transfer would violate express legal statutory prohibitions," Holder said in a letter to Representative Frank Wolf, who fought the proposal.

Democratic Senator Dick Durbin of Illinois said the move would create 1,000 jobs in the area of Thomson. Federal officials have said that building a new prison instead of buying Thomson would take years and cost about $400 million. State officials estimated that annual operation of the facility would generate more than $122 million in operating expenditures, including salaries and $61 million in local business sales. The prison was fully activated in January 2019.

Notable inmates

References

External links

Infrastructure completed in 2001
Buildings and structures in Carroll County, Illinois
Guantanamo Bay detention camp
Prisons in Illinois
2001 establishments in Illinois
Federal Bureau of Prisons